Tangaza is a Local Government Area in Sokoto State, Nigeria. Its headquarters is in the town of Gidan Madi.

Tangaza shares a border with the Republic of Niger to the north. It has an area of 2,477 km and a population of 113,853 at the 2006 census.

The postal code of the area is 841.

References

Local Government Areas in Sokoto State